David Yoo (born 1974) is an American fiction writer.

Overview

David Yoo is the author of two young adult novels. He has also contributed to several anthologies. He has published fiction and nonfiction in Massachusetts Review, Rush Hour, Maryland Review, and the anthology Guys Write for Guys Read (Viking). He is also a columnist for KoreAm Journal.

David Yoo is a graduate from Skidmore College with an MA in creative writing from the University of Colorado-Boulder. His first novel, Girls For Breakfast (Delacorte) Korean a Booksense Pick, an NYPL Books For the Teen Age selection, and a Reading Rants Top Ten Books for Teens choice.

He lives in Massachusetts, where he regularly plays adult soccer and Sega Genesis, teaches fiction at the Gotham Writers' Workshop, and is a mentor for the Solstice MFA program at Pine Manor College in Chestnut Hill, MA.

Books
 Girls For Breakfast (2004) 
 Stop Me If You've Heard This One Before (2008)
 The Detention Club (2011)
 The Choke Artist (2012)

References

External links
David Yoo's website
David Yoo's blog
Book trailer for Stop Me If You've Heard This One Before

1974 births
Living people
Skidmore College alumni
University of Colorado alumni
Novelists from Massachusetts
21st-century American novelists
American male novelists
21st-century American male writers